Common names: twin-spotted rattlesnake, western twin-spotted rattlesnake, more

Crotalus pricei is a species of venomous snake, a pit viper in the family Viperidae. The species is endemic to the southwestern United States and northern Mexico. Two subspecies are recognized.

Etymology
The specific name, pricei, is in honor of William Wightman "Billy" Price (1871–1922), a field biologist, who collected the first specimens which became the type series.

Description

Adults of C. pricei usually do not exceed 50–60 cm (about 20–24 in) in total length (including tail). The maximum total length recorded is 66 cm (26 in).

The color pattern consists of a gray, bluish-gray, brownish-gray, or medium- to reddish-brown ground color, usually with a fine brown speckling. This is overlaid with a series of dorsal blotches that tend to be divided down the median line to form 39-64 pairs.

Common names
Common names for C. pricei include twin-spotted rattlesnake, western twin-spotted rattlesnake, Price's rattlesnake, Arizona spotted rattlesnake, spotted rattlesnake, and Arizona twin-spotted rattlesnake.

Geographic range
C. pricei is found in the United States in southeastern Arizona. In northern Mexico, it occurs in the Sierra Madre Occidental in Sonora, Chihuahua, and Durango. It has also been found in the Sierra Madre Oriental in southeastern Coahuila, Nuevo León, and Tamaulipas, with isolated records in San Luis Potosí and Aguascalientes. The type locality given is "Huachuca Mts., Arizona" (Cochise County, Arizona, United States).

Conservation status
This species, C. pricei, is classified as Least Concern on the IUCN Red List of Threatened Species (v3.1, 2001). Species are listed as such due to their wide distribution, presumed large population, or because they are unlikely to be declining fast enough to qualify for listing in a more threatened category. The population trend was stable when assessed in 2007.

Subspecies

References

Further reading
Behler JL, King FW (1979). The Audubon Society Field Guide to North American Reptiles and Amphibians. New York: Alfred A. Knopf. 743 pp. . (Crotalus pricei, p. 691 + Plate 637).
Hubbs, Brian; O'Connor, Brendan (2012). A Guide to the Rattlesnakes and other Venomous Serpents of the United States. Tempe, Arizona: Tricolor Books. 129 pp. . (Crotalus pricei pricei, pp. 62–63).
Schmidt KP, Davis DD (1941). Field Book of Snakes of the United States and Canada. New York: G.P. Putnam's Sons. 365 pp. (Crotalus triseriatus pricei, p. 306).
Smith HM, Brodie ED Jr (1982). Reptiles of North America: A Guide to Field Identification. New York: Golden Press. 240 pp. . (Crotalus pricei, pp. 206–207).
Stebbins RC (2003). A Field Guide to Western Reptiles and Amphibians, Third Edition. The Peterson Field Guide Series ®. Boston and New York: Houghton Mifflin Company. xiii + 533 pp. . (Crotalus pricei, p. 417 + Plate 52 + Map 184).

External links

pricei
Reptiles described in 1895
Reptiles of Mexico
Fauna of the Sierra Madre Occidental
Reptiles of the United States
Fauna of the Sierra Madre Oriental